.yt is the Internet country code top-level domain (ccTLD) for Mayotte, a part of the registry for France. The official registry address nic.yt redirects to the French registry site, AFNIC. Registrations, which had been suspended, resumed in December 2011.

See also 
 Internet in Mayotte
 Internet in France
 ISO 3166-2:YT
 .fr –CC TLD for the French Republic
 .eu –CC TLD for the European Union

External links
 IANA .yt whois information

Computer-related introductions in 1997
Country code top-level domains
Economy of Mayotte
Council of European National Top Level Domain Registries members

sv:Toppdomän#Y